Australia competed at the 2016 Summer Paralympics in Rio de Janeiro, Brazil, from 7 to 18 September 2016. Australia repeated its 2012 Summer Paralympics achievement in finishing fifth of the medal tally.

Notable achievements at the Games:

 Jessica Gallagher became the first Australian Paralympian to win medals at both the Summer Paralympics and Winter Paralympics by winning a bronze medal in cycling.
 Kurt Fearnley finished Paralympic his career with 13 medals including a silver and bronze in Rio. His silver medal in the Men's Marathon T52-54 meant he had won medals in this event at four successive Paralympics (2004-2016).
Ellie Cole joined the list of leading Australian Paralympic medallists by winning six medals - 2 gold, 3 silver and 1 bronze. Her medal tally at the end of Rio was 6 gold, 4 silver and bronze.
Kieran Modra won a bronze medal in cycling and this meant that he had medalled at six Paralympics.
Samuel Von Einem won Australia first medal in table tennis since Terry Biggs won gold in 1984.
Jonathon Milne won Australia's first medal in archery since 1968.
Curtis McGrath and Katie Kelly became Australia's first gold medallists in paracanoe and paratriathlon respectively.
 Dylan Alcott became only the fifth Australian Paralympian to win gold medals in two sports by winning two gold medals in wheelchair tennis. He previously won gold in wheelchair basketball.
Athletes and teams that won their event again in Rio were: Ellie Cole (swimming), Brenden Hall (swimming), David Nicholas (cycling), Carol Cooke (cycling), Daniel Fitzgibbon/Liesl Tesch (sailing) and the wheelchair rugby team.

Administration

In May 2015, the Australian Paralympic Committee (APC) announced Kate McLoughlin as the Chef de Mission. She replaced Jason Hellwig, the former APC CEO, who stepped down from the role. The APC appointed Kurt Fearnley and Daniela Di Toro as team captains. 2004 Athens Games was the last time the team had captains. Wheelchair basketballer Brad Ness was announced as the Opening Ceremony flag bearer at a ceremony at the Paralympic Village on 5 September 2016. Curtis McGrath who lost his legs in the Afghanistan war and won Australia's first gold medal in paracanoe at the Games carried the Australian flag in the closing ceremony.

Fundraising
The APC stated that it needed to raise  $7 million to fund its Rio 2016 campaign. The majority of APC's funding to send Australian teams to major events originates from fundraising. In January 2016, it launched the Australian Paralympic Foundation to manage its fundraising. Cadbury made the first major donation of $1 million. In the four-year period leading up to Rio, the Australian Sports Commission (ASC) provided $62 million in funding. At the Team Launch, Prime Minister of Australia Malcolm Turnbull stated that the Australian Government had provided close to $65 million direct funding to support the 167 athletes with a disability in the lead-up to Rio." To assist with funding raising, its broadcast partner Seven Network organized a Parathon on 5 March 2016.

Official team launch
The Official Australian Paralympic Team Launch was held in Sydney on 20 June 2016. The major dignitaries present were Prime Minister of Australia, Malcolm Turnbull, Federal Minister for Sport, Sussan Ley, the Shadow Minister for Sport, Jim Chalmers and the New South Wales Minister for Sport, Trade, Tourism and Major Events Stuart Ayres. The Launch was held during the 2016 Australian Federal Election. There were more than 30 Rio hopefuls and representatives from each Australian Paralympic Team since 1960 in attendance. Glenn Tasker, Australian Paralympic Committee President stated that "We are not just chasing medals, we are aspiring to shape attitudes and perceptions of disability and to build on the huge momentum and growth that the Paralympic movement is experiencing.” Prime Minister Turnbull said: "I want to salute the achievements of all of our Paralympians past and present. I want to wish you all the best on the road to Rio. you are doing our nation such great service. We are with you, we are with you all the way, we back you all the way, all the way to Rio."

Medallists
The following Australian competitors won medals at the games.

|  style="text-align:left; width:78%; vertical-align:top;"|

| width="22%" align="left" valign="top" |

Multiple medallists

The following Australian athletes won multiple medals at the 2016 Paralympic Games:

Team
List of team members as of 17 September 2016.

In the by discipline sections below, medallists' names are bolded.

* – Indicates the athlete competed in preliminaries but not the final relay.

Australia was given additional qualification slots in the sports of goalball (six athletes), athletics (two athletes) and wheelchair tennis (one athlete) after Russia was suspended from the Games by the International Paralympic Committee. Two athletes from the original team of 178 did not attend - Emily Tapp due to injury and Michael Gallager due to doping violation.

Several team members have changed their previous Paralympic sports at these Games: Dylan Alcott (wheelchair tennis), Jessica Gallagher (cycling), Daniela Di Toro (table tennis) and Claire McLean (paratriathlon).

Archery

Jonathon Milne earned Australia a spot at the Rio Games following his performance at the 2015 World Archery Para Championships and he was selected to make his debut in the Australian team on 29 July 2016.

|-
|align=left|Jonathon Milne||align=left|Individual compound open||672 ||9 ||align="center" | W 143-136|| align="center" | W 137-129|| align="center" | W 139-128 || align="center" | L 138-139|| align="center" | W 145-142 ||
|}

Milne won Australia first archery medal since 1984 by winning a bronze medal.

Athletics

Australian Paralympic Committee announced a team of 44 athletes on 2 August 2016. An additional two athletes - Tamsin Colley and Jessee Wyatt were added after the Russian suspension. Emily Tapp was selected but forced to withdraw after a burnt leg did not heal in time for the Games.

(d) Paralympic Games debut 
Australia won 26 medals – 3 gold, 9 silver and 14 bronze. Gold medalists were – Brayden Davidson, Scott Reardon and James Turner. Russell Short attended his 8th Games, Christine Dawes her 6th Games and Kurt Fearnley his fifth Games.

Track events - women

Track events - men

Field events - women

Field events - men

Legend: Q= Qualified for final; OC= Oceania Record; PR= Paralympic Record; WR= World Record

Boccia

Australia selected Daniel Michel and his ramp assistant Ashlee McClure for their debut Games. Michel is the first player since the 2000 Sydney Paralympics

Cycling

The cycling team was announced on 30 May 2016. The team consisted of 13 athletes and three sighted pilots: For Modra, this would be his eighth Paralympic Games. Michael Gallagher was originally selected but on 2 September 2016 he was withdrawn from the team due to a positive doping test sample.

Track Events — Women

Track Events — Men

Track Events — Mixed

Road Events — Women

Road Events — Men

Equestrian

On 28 June 2014, four riders were selected. 
Women - Emma Booth (d), Sharon Jarvis, Lisa Martin (d), Katie Umback (d) 

Individual competition

Team competition

Goalball

The Australian women's team (Belles) originally failed to qualify after finishing third at the IBSA Goalball Asia Pacific Championships in Hangzhou, China.  Australian men's team failed to qualify after finishing fifth at the IBSA Goalball Asia Pacific Championships in Hangzhou, China.  Following the re-allocation of Russia's spot, Australia's women found themselves getting a last minute invite to Rio. Australia's women enter the tournament ranked ninth in the world.

Paracanoeing

On 16 June 2016, six athletes were selected to compete in the new Paralympic Games sport of paracanoe.

Paratriathlon

Australian Paralympic Committee announced a team of seven athletes on 3 August 2016. Paratriathlon makes its debut at the Rio Games.

(d) Paralympic Games debut
Women's Events

Men's Events

Rowing

On 11 July 2016, Australian Paralympic Committee announced a team of 8 athletes. Australia will have a boat in the Legs, Trunk and Arms Mixed Coxed Four for the first time.

(d) Paralympic Games debut 

Qualification Legend: FA=Final A (medal); FB=Final B (non-medal); R=Repechage

Sailing

Selected team of 6 athletes  - Matthew Bugg (Single person 2.4mR), Daniel Fitzgibbon and Liesl Tesch (Two person Skud 18), Colin Harrison, Russell Boaden, Jonathan Harris (Three person Sonar). This will be the last Games for sailing has been taken off the 2020 Tokyo Games program.

Shooting

Shooting Australia nominated six athletes in May 2016. Libby Kosmala was selected for her twelfth Games. The team was missing Paralympian Ashley Adams who was killed in 2015 accident.

(d) Paralympic Games debut

Australia did not win any medals. Australia's best placing was Christopher Pitt's fourth.

Swimming

36 athletes were selected on 1 August 2016. Three athletes were selected for their fourth Games - Matthew Levy, Jeremy McClure and Rick Pendleton  22 athletes were selected for their debut Paralympics with two 14-year-olds Tiffany Thomas-Kane and Katja Dedekind being selected.

Australian won 29 medals including 10 gold. Maddison Elliott won three gold and Lakeisha Patterson and Ellie Cole won two gold. 
(d) Paralympic Games debut

Men's events

Women's events

Mixed events

Legend: Q= Qualified for final; OC= Oceania Record; PR= Paralympic Record; WR= World Record

Table tennis

Five athletes were selected to represent Australia. Daniela Di Toro previously represented Australia in wheelchair tennis and Melissa Tapper was set to become the first Australian to compete at both the Summer Paralympics and Summer Olympics in the same year.

Samuel Von Einem in winning the silver medal won Australia's first medal since Terry Biggs won gold in 1984.

(d)= Paralympic Games debut

Men's tournament

Women's tournament

Wheelchair basketball

Men's tournament

The Rollers qualified by winning the 2015 Asia Oceania Qualifying Tournament. On 19 July 2016, the APC announced a team of twelve players with five of them making their Paralympic debut. During the draw, Brazil had the choice of which group they wanted to be in.  They were partnered with Spain, who would be in the group Brazil did not select.  Brazil chose Group B, which included Iran, the United States, Great Britain, Germany and Algeria.  That left Spain in Group A with Australia, Canada, Turkey, the Netherlands and Japan.

Team roster
Josh Allison (d), Jannik Blair, Adam Deans (d), Tristan Knowles, Bill Latham, Matthew McShane (d), Brad Ness, Shaun Norris, Tom O'Neill-Thorne (d), Shawn Russell (d), Tige Simmons, Brett Stibners 
(d) Paralympic Games debut

Group play standings

Quarter finals

5th - 6th Classification

Women's tournament
The Gliders did not qualify after finishing second to China at the 2015 Asia Oceania Qualifying Tournament.

Wheelchair rugby

Australia won the 2014 World Wheelchair Rugby Championships, thereby automatically qualifying to defend the Paralympic title they won in London. On 25 July 2016, the APC announced a team of 12 players. Australia entered the tournament ranked number two in the world.

(d) Paralympic Games debut

Semi-finals

 Gold medal match

Wheelchair tennis

Selected team of 4 athletes on 28 July 2016. Sarah Calati was added to the team as a result of Russia's selection. Ben Weekes was competing at his fourth Games and wheelchair basketball gold medallist Dylan Alcott was competing in wheelchair tennis for the first time. Sarah Calati was a late inclusion due to the banning of the Russian team.

Men's tournament

Women's tournament

(d)= Paralympic Games debut

Administration and support
Team Executive – Kate McLoughlin  (Chef de Mission), Paul Bird (Deputy Chef de Mission), Phil Borgeaud (head of performance), Chris Nunn (Head of Operations)
Media Team – Tim Mannion (Head of Media and Broadcast), Sascha Ryner (Digital Coordinator and Media Liaison Officer - Table Tennis, Boccia), Margie McDonald  (Media Liaison Officer – Athletics, Archery), Gennie Sheer  (Media Liaison Officer – Cycling), Amanda Shalala (Media Liaison Officer– Rowing, Canoe), Alexandra Factor  (Media Liaison Officer – Equestrian, Shooting), Neil Cross  (Broadcast Liaison Officer), Alice Wheeler (Broadcast Liaison Officer), Brett Frawley (Videographer), Simon Christie (Videographer), Jeff Crow (Chief Photographer), Jacqueline Chartres (Media Manager Sydney Office)

Medical Staff -

Broadcasting
The Australian Paralympic Committee purchased the broadcast rights to the Socchi Winter and Rio Summer Games for less than $400,000. It then sold the rights to the Seven Network. Previously the Australian Broadcasting Corporation broadcast the Games. Seven Network broadcast the Games on 7Two as well as via digital channels, including the 7Live app. There were 20 per cent more hours broadcast than the London Paralympics. Broadcast statistics included:
 Te Games reached 4.4 million TV viewers during the broadcast period
 Top session average audience was 225,000 with a peak of 467,000 on the Day 7 highlights show
 251,000 online streams
Major advertisers and sponsors were: Optus, Samsung, Visa Inc, Swisse, Woolworths Supermarkets and Toyota.

See also

Australia at the 2016 Summer Olympics
Australia at the Paralympics
Australian Paralympic Archery team
Australian Paralympic Athletics Team
Australian Paralympic Boccia Team
Australian Paralympic Cycling Team
Australian Paralympic Equestrian Team
Australian Paralympic Paracanoe Team
Australian Paralympic Paratriathlon Team
Australian Paralympic Rowing Team
Australian Paralympic Sailing Team
Australian Paralympic Shooting Team
Australian Paralympic Swim Team
Australian Paralympic Table Tennis Team
Australian Paralympic wheelchair tennis team
Australia men's national wheelchair basketball team
Australia national wheelchair rugby team
Australia women's national goalball team

References

External links
 Australian Paralympic Committee 2016 Rio Portal
 Australian Paralympic Committee Media Guide Rio 2016 Paralympic Games

 
Nations at the 2016 Summer Paralympics
2016
2016 in Australian sport